The Baozang Temple is a Guanyin Temple in Fenyuan Township, Changhua County, Taiwan.

History
The temple was originally built in 1672, during the Qing Dynasty rule. It was then rebuilt in 1971. The temple is designated as a third grade historic building. In 1995, public toilet and parking lot was built in front of the temple, enabling more visitors to visit the temple.

Architecture
The temple presents refined sculptures and traditional Chinese architecture style. The building was built in a tri-hall dual side-wings structure. It displays several historic objects and almost 100 statues of gods.

Transportation
The temple is accessible by bus from Changhua Station of Taiwan Railways.

See also
 Hushan Temple
 Kaihua Temple
 Lukang Longshan Temple
 List of temples in Taiwan
 List of tourist attractions in Taiwan

References

1672 establishments in Taiwan
Religious buildings and structures completed in 1672
Mazu temples in Changhua County
Guanyin temples